Maria Anna "Mizzi" Zwerenz, married name  Marie Guttmann (13 July 1876 in Piešťany – 14 June 1947 in Vienna) was an Austrian opera singer (soprano), theater and film actress.

Biography
Her father Karl Ludwig Zwerenz (30 September 1850 in Vienna; 28 December 1925)<ref>Wilhelm Kosch, Ingrid Bigler-Marschall: Deutsches Theater-Lexikon. Biographisches und bibliographisches Handbuch. Volume 7, 38./39. Lieferung: Zedler  Zysset. Walter de Gruyter, Berlin (among other) 2011, S. 3925.</ref> was an actor and director, as well as director of theaters in Bolzano, Merano, Bucharest, Teplice, Iglau, Pressburg and Bad Hall. Her mother, Eveline Zwerenz (* 1842 – February 1921 in Vienna), worked at the Stadttheater in Baden bei Wien from 1888 to 1891 and 1893 to 1903. Her grandfather Karl Zwerenz (1826-1898) and her great-grandfather Karl Ludwig Costenoble were Hofburg actors. For now, she did not want to follow in the footsteps of the family. Then she followed the tradition, took lessons and made her debut in Baden bei Wien. She played in Bielitz, at the summer theater in Mödling, toured with the Wiener Soubrettenensemble in Russia, in Friedrich-Wilhelmstädtischen Theater in Berlin and sang between 1901 and 1920 in the Carltheater in Vienna. At the Viennese  Apollo-Theater, Zwerenz was a major force. In the early 1920s, she ran the Mizzi Zwerenz establishment in Baden, for which she collaborated with popular actors (including Fritz Imhoff). In addition to her stage work, she appeared in several films, including Die kleine Veronika (1929) und Walzer um den Stephansturm'' (1935).

Mizzi Zwerenz died of a heart condition on 14 June 1947 in Vienna. She is buried at the city's Hietzing Cemetery (group 29, number 9).

Zwerenz was from 1905 married to actor Arthur Guttmann (1877-1952), brother of the twins Emil and Paul Guttmann from 1905. and in 1937 she retired from the stage. Their son, Fritz Zwerenz (3 September 1895 in Vienna; 12 October 1970 in Linz), was a successful, sometimes as Kapellmeister supporting his mother's artistry in the field of music theater. After World War II, he worked mainly as a concert conductor and at the radio station Radio Linz.

Notes

References

External links

1876 births
1947 deaths
19th-century Austrian women opera singers
20th-century Austrian women opera singers
Austrian operatic sopranos
Austrian film actresses
Austrian stage actresses
Austro-Hungarian singers